Benchijigua Express is a fast ferry, operated by Fred. Olsen Express between the Canary Islands, Tenerife, La Gomera and La Palma in the Atlantic Ocean. She was delivered in April 2005. Her body is made of aluminium with a special offshore coating, and is the second-largest vessel with an aluminium hull. The ship's name, derived from the village of Benchijigua on La Gomera where Fredrik Olsen had property, was previously used twice since 1999.

Design and construction
The Benchijigua Express was built by Austal in Henderson, Western Australia.

The vessel is powered by four diesel engines of MTU Series 8000 (20V 8000 M71L), each with 9,100 kW at 1,150 rpm driven electric generators, housed in two engine rooms. Each of the two diesels in the rear engine-room drive one Kamewa 125 SII steerable waterjet propulsion from Rolls-Royce. The overall performance of both machines at the front engine room is transferred to a Kamewa 180 BII booster waterjet. The electrical energy is generated by four MTU 12V 2000 M40 generator units.

Up to 1,291 passengers are distributed on two decks. Due to the short crossing time, there are no passenger cabins. The vehicle deck can be loaded and unloaded in 30 minutes.

Predecessor
The ship's name is now used for the third time since 1999. The first Benchijigua Express (IMO number: 9206712) was entered into service in 1999 and renamed Bentayga Express  later in 1999. The second Benchijigua Express (IMO No: 9213337) started its service between Los Cristianos and San Sebastián in January 2000. In November 2004 she was renamed Bentago Express to free the name for this vessel.

Related designs
Austal and General Dynamics based the hull design of the Independence class littoral combat ship on the Benchijigua Express design.

References

External links 

 Fred. Olsen Express
 Info at Austal

Ferries of Spain
2004 ships
La Gomera
Trimarans
Transport in the Canary Islands
Ships built by Austal